Cold Dog Soup is a 1990 British comedy film directed by Alan Metter. It is based on the novel Cold Dog Soup by Stephen Dobyns.

Plot
Randy Quaid plays a Zen taxi driver whose passenger is trying to dispose of his date's dead dog Jasper. The driver is respected by the peculiar groups he interests in the dog's corpse and effects, and the one-gloved heroine becomes more interested in him than in her date.

Reception
In a negative review for the film, timeout.com wrote that "no stone is left unturned by Thomas Pope's horribly repetitive script, or by Alan Metter in his drivelling attempt to create a surreal comic nightmare."

References

External links
 
 

1990 films
1990 comedy films
American comedy films
Films about dogs
Films based on American novels
Films scored by Michael Kamen
HandMade Films films
Films directed by Alan Metter
1990s English-language films
1990s American films